"Calamita" quadrilineatus is a possible species of frog described in 1799. The type locality is unknown, but the original publication considered Calamita quadrilineatus to be similar to Hyla leucophyllata. The status of this name placed in the subfamily Hylinae is unclear and it is considered a nomen dubium. The type series is presumed to be lost.

References

Hylinae
Taxa named by Johann Gottlob Theaenus Schneider
Amphibians described in 1799
Taxonomy articles created by Polbot